Henri Pouctal (21 October 1860 – 2 February 1922) was an early French silent film director and actor  best known for his silent films of the 1910s, notably Alsace or Chantecoq, and his directorship of The Count of Monte Cristo serials in 1918.

Pouctal directed about 100 films between 1908 and 1922.

External links 

1860 births
1922 deaths
People from La Ferté-sous-Jouarre
French film directors
Silent film directors
French male silent film actors
French male screenwriters
20th-century French screenwriters
20th-century French male actors
20th-century French male writers